Bergün/Bravuogn railway station is a railway station in the municipality of Bergün Filisur, in the Swiss canton of Graubünden. It is located on the  Albula line of the Rhaetian Railway. Hourly services operate on this section of the line.

The Bahnmuseum Albula (Albula Railway Museum) is located at the station. The RhB Ge 6/6 #407 "crocodile" has been placed at its entrance.

Services
The following services stop at Bergün/Bravuogn:

 InterRegio: hourly service between Chur and St. Moritz.
 Regio: limited service between Chur and St. Moritz.

References

External links
 
 
 Webcam overlooking Bergün/Bravuogn station
 Webcam overlooking the horseshoe curve south of Bergün/Bravuogn station

Railway stations in Switzerland opened in 1903
Bergün Filisur
Railway stations in Graubünden
Rhaetian Railway stations